Dr. Moirangthem Nara Singh (born Tentha,  is an Indian politician from state Manipur. He was former Cabinet Minister  for Arts and Culture and Sericulture in Manipur during 2002 to 2004.

Early life
Nara was born on 27 May 1949 in Tentha Village to M. Tona.

Political career
He joined politics in the year 1973 for the first time and he was elected as Member of the Legislative Assembly for the first time CPI in state Manipur.

References

External links
Facebook page of Dr.Nara

Living people
1949 births
People from Manipur
21st-century Indian politicians
Communist Party of India politicians from Manipur